The Yamaha XT125R is a single cylinder enduro/adventure motorcycle made by Yamaha since the 2003 model year. It shares its power plant with the YBR125 and its supermoto brother, the Yamaha XT125X. While parts such as the transmission and chassis are produced in Japan, and the engine in Brazil, the motorcycle itself is assembled in Bologna, Italy for the European market by the Italian bike company Malaguti.

The 21-inch front wheel and the 18-inch rear with enduro-style tires make it fit for both on- and off-road use. Seat height and ground clearance are higher compared to the Supermotard version and the machine features the typical dual-purpose handling characteristics, which makes it suitable for a wide range of duties, from crossing rough city roads to small country lanes or paths.

The XT range debuted in 1976 with the XT500 single four-stroke "torque hammer". Later, other models followed spreading from XT125 to the latest XT660. Both the XT and DT ranges represent the typical Yamaha model development consistency, with model refinements over a long period of time.

The XT 125R has an electronic display with different selectable modes: numbered RPM, lap timer, mileage, average speed, clock and trip distance. The standard display is a bar displayed rev-counter along with a speed reading. Lights on the side of the display indicate high beam and low beam, low fuel, indicators and neutral.

In 2012, Yamaha ceased retailing the XT 125 range in the United Kingdom. There is also an X variant model.

External links 
Official Yamaha Europe XT125R page
History of the XT range

XT125R
Dual-sport motorcycles
Motorcycles introduced in 2003